Hirasawa Dam is an earthfill dam located in Chiba Prefecture in Japan. The dam is used for irrigation. The catchment area of the dam is 2.4 km2. The dam impounds about 14  ha of land when full and can store 1160 thousand cubic meters of water. The construction of the dam was started on 1986 and completed in 1998.

References

Dams in Chiba Prefecture
1998 establishments in Japan